The 2021–22 Basketball Bundesliga, known as the easyCredit BBL for sponsorship reasons, was the 56th season of the Basketball Bundesliga (BBL), the top-tier level of professional club basketball in Germany. It started on 23 September 2021 and concluded on 19 June 2022.

Alba Berlin won their third straight and eleventh overall title.

Teams

Team changes

As only one team was promoted, Giessen were awarded a wild card on 21 May 2021.

Arenas and locations

Regular season

Standings

Results

Playoffs

Awards and statistics

Major award winners
The awards were announced on 21 and 28 April 2022.

Statistical leaders

German clubs in European competitions

References

External links
Official website 

Basketball Bundesliga seasons
German